Búðir (also transliterated Búdir) is a small hamlet in Búðahraun lava fields in Staðarsveit, which is in the western region of Iceland, on the westernmost tip of the Snaefellsnes peninsula where Hraunhafnará falls to the sea, the original old name of Búðir having been Hraunhöfn.

The village belongs to Snæfellsbær, a municipality that has its administrative centre in the town of Ólafsvík.

Overview
Búðir is a small hamlet; the home of popular country inn and restaurant, Hotel Búðir and a small medieval church. A fire claimed the restaurant and  Hótel Búðir burned down on 21 February 2001, however they were reconstructed in the original style.

Commercial activity began at Búðir shortly after Iceland was settled. Originally the main function of the hamlet was that to act as a commercial and trade hub for Snæfellsnes and the surrounding west coast region, during the Danish occupation. Today the small hamlet is a center of attraction in Snæfellsnes for tourism.

Sources
 Vesturland.is, Afþreying og staðir 14 júlí 2010
 Þorsteinn Jósepsson, Steindór Steindórsson, Páll Líndal, Landið þitt Ísland, H-K, Örn og Örlygur, 1982

References

External links
Búðir travel guide
Hotel Búðir

Populated places in Western Region (Iceland)